Pan Ximing (born 11 January 1993 in Shenyang) is a Chinese footballer who currently plays for Chinese Super League side Hebei China Fortune.

Club career
Pan Ximing started his football career when he joined Changchun Yatai's youth academy. He was loaned to China League Two side Shaanxi Laochenggen from 2011 to 2013. He moved to Portuguese Second Division side Gondomar in August 2014. Pan transferred to Segunda Liga side Leixões along with Guo Yi on 6 July 2015.

Pan returned to China and joined Chinese Super League side Tianjin Teda on 29 January 2016. He made his debut for Tianjin in the 2016 Chinese FA Cup on 11 May 2016, in a 7–1 away victory against Guangdong Haoxin. On 14 June 2016, he made his Super league debut in a 2–0 loss against Guangzhou Evergrande, coming on as a substitute for Fan Baiqun in the 59th minute. On 9 September 2017, he scored his first goal for the club in a 3–1 away loss against Shanghai SIPG. At the end of the 2017 season, Pan went on to make 20 appearances and scoring once in all competitions. However, he terminated his contract with the club at the end of 2017.

In January 2018, Pan signed a four-year contract with Tianjin Teda's city rival Tianjin Quanjian.

Career statistics
.

References

External links
 

1993 births
Living people
People from Benxi
Chinese footballers
Footballers from Liaoning
Leixões S.C. players
Tianjin Jinmen Tiger F.C. players
Tianjin Tianhai F.C. players
Hebei F.C. players
Chinese Super League players
China League Two players
Liga Portugal 2 players
Segunda Divisão players
Chinese expatriate footballers
Expatriate footballers in Portugal
Chinese expatriate sportspeople in Portugal
Association football defenders